The James Alexander Veasey House, also known as the Veasey-Leach House, is a Colonial Revival style house in Tulsa, Oklahoma that was built in 1913.  It was listed on the National Register of Historic Places in 1989 "for its architectural significance as a local landmark example of the Colonial Revival style".

It is included in the Buena Vista Park Historic District, later listed on the NRHP.

It was designed by local architect John T. Blair. The structure is a two-story Colonial Revival house. It is T-shaped, has clapboard siding and a gabled roof with a dormer centered above the entry.

The original owner, James Alexander Veasey, was a lawyer for the Dawes Commission who settled in Tulsa and founded the Holland Hall School. He lived in this house until 1938, when he retired as chief counsel for Carter Oil Company, a subsidiary of Standard Oil Company of New Jersey.

References

Houses on the National Register of Historic Places in Oklahoma
Colonial Revival architecture in Oklahoma
Houses completed in 1913
Buildings and structures in Tulsa, Oklahoma
Houses in Tulsa County, Oklahoma
1913 establishments in Oklahoma
National Register of Historic Places in Tulsa, Oklahoma